Second Valley is a coastal town on the Fleurieu Peninsula in South Australia.

The name is derived from being the next valley north of Rapid Bay, the initial camp on South Australian mainland of Colonel William Light.  It is a popular scuba diving destination.

Despite its small size, Second Valley has been rated as one of Australia's top ten beaches, with the variety of activities and opportunities to explore cited as contributing factors.

Governance
Second Valley is located within the federal division of Mayo, the state electoral district of Mawson and the local government area of the District Council of Yankalilla.

Gallery

See also
 Ingalalla Waterfalls

References

External links
 

Coastal towns in South Australia
Fleurieu Peninsula
Gulf St Vincent
Underwater diving sites in Australia